John Mohawk (30 August 1945 – 13 December 2006) was an American historian, writer, and social activist.

Background 
He was a Seneca, born into the Turtle clan on the Cattaraugus Indian Reservation, located in western New York State. He graduated from Hartwick College with a Bachelor of Arts degree in history in 1967, and later earned a Ph.D. from the University of Buffalo.

Work 
Mohawk was a major visionary of the Haudenosaune Confederacy of Nations who played a singularly important role in fashioning the intellectual bridge of the traditional Indian movement toward the national and international community. Firmly based in the traditional Seneca Longhouse, he was a practitioner and master singer and orator. He was a writer, journalist, researcher, and lecturer. A specialist in the field of culture and community economic development and an activist and commentator on the cultural survival of indigenous peoples, Mohawk was a resolute traditionalist, social activist, and negotiator in local and international conflicts. He helped negotiate the conflict between the Sandinista government of Nicaragua and the Miskito people in 1983, and was a peace guide at armed standoffs between Native traditionalists and government agencies in North America.

Mohawk was a co-founder of several organizations supporting Native Americans in the United States and internationally, such as the Indigenous Peoples Network and the Emergency Response International Network, the Seventh Generation Fund, the Indian Law Resource Center and the Iroquois White Corn Project. He worked tirelessly to revitalize indigenous agriculture, healthy food (e.g., Iroquois white corn) and the "Slow Food" movement. He was a journalist, a longtime editor, and contributor to "Akwesasne Notes", "Daybreak", and "Indian Country Today," and director of the Center for Indigenous Studies at the Center of the Americas State University of New York (SUNY) in Buffalo, New York.

Books 

 The Iroquois Creation Story: John Arthur Gibson and JNB Hewitt's Myth of the Earth Grasper
 Utopian Legacies: A History of Conquest and Oppression in the Western World
 The Red Buffalo
 Thinking in Indian, a posthumously published collection of essays, edited by Jose Barreiro, is in print (Fulcrum).

He was also a co-editor of Exiled in the Land of the Free (with Oren Lyons ), and primary author of A Basic Call to Consciousness (Akwesasne Notes/Farm Publishing Company), the classic collective work of the Haudenosaune Grand Council (c. 1976-77) on the meaning of traditionalism as a guide to political activism. Basic Call to Consciousness is perhaps the most significant volume in the early documents of International Indigenous activism.

Recognition 
He was a Doctor Honoris Causa of several universities, winner of journalism awards Native American Journalists Association (NAJA), as well as a father and grandfather, teacher and educator of several generations of Indian people, a shaper of activist scholars, and a generous mentor.

See also
John Arthur Gibson

References

1945 births
2006 deaths
20th-century American historians
American male non-fiction writers
20th-century Native Americans
Hartwick College alumni
Historians from New York (state)
Native American activists
Native American journalists
Native American writers
Seneca people
University at Buffalo alumni
20th-century American male writers